Kumbakudy  is a village in Tiruchirappalli taluk of Tiruchirappalli district in Tamil Nadu, India.

Demographics 

As per the 2001 census, Kumbakudy had a population of 475 with 243 males and 232 females. The sex ratio was 955 and the literacy rate, 79.91.

References 

 

Villages in Tiruchirappalli district